Baoquan is a town in Kedong County, western Heilongjiang province, Northeast China, located on a tributary of the Nonni River more than  east-northeast of the city of Qiqihar.

External links
Official website of Baoquan Town Government

Township-level divisions of Heilongjiang